Franklin Andrew Merrifield Baron (19 January 1923 – 9 April 2016) was the first Chief Minister of Dominica. His daughter Francine Baron is the current Minister of Foreign and CARICOM Affairs of Dominica.

See also
List of heads of government of Dominica

References

Dominica politicians
Finance ministers of Dominica
1923 births
2016 deaths